This article lists the albums attributed to the series Mobile Suit Gundam Wing and Gundam Wing: Endless Waltz.

Soundtracks

Shin Kidousenki Gundam Wing: Operation 1

Catalog Number
KICA-251

Shin Kidousenki Gundam Wing: Operation 2

Catalog Number
KICA-263

Shin Kidousenki Gundam Wing: Operation 3

Catalog Number
KICA-277

Shin Kidousenki Gundam Wing: Operation 4

Catalog Number
KICA-295

Shin Kidousenki Gundam Wing: Operation S - Endless Waltz - Original Sound Track

Catalog Number
KICA-2063

Singles

Just Communication

Catalog Number
KIDA-99

It's Just Love!

Catalog Number
APDM-5023

Rhythm Emotion

Catalog Number
KIDA-121

Mind Education

Catalog Number
KIDA-139

White Reflection

Catalog Number
KIDS-320

Last Impression

Catalog Number
KIDS-391

Radio Drama CDs

Shin Kidousenki Gundam Wing: Blind Target-1

Catalog Number
KICA-329

Shin Kidousenki Gundam Wing: Blind Target-2

Catalog Number
KICA-338

References

External links
 About Gundam Wing.com: Gundam Wing Merchandise - CD Singles, CDs, and Audio Products
 All the Gundam Sound Soft Catalogue: Gundam Wing (Japanese)

Anime soundtracks
Gundam lists
Mobile Suit Gundam Wing